Gi Group Spa is one of the largest companies in the staffing industry and is headquartered in Milan, Italy. The Group, founded by Stefano Colli Lanzi in 1998,  is also a global corporate member of World Employment Confederation (former CIETT), the international confederation of private employment agencies.

History 
Gi Group was founded in Italy in 1998 by Stefano Colli Lanzi. In 2004 the Group acquired the employment agency of Fiat, Worknet. One year later, the operations in the outplacement sector started with DBM Italia. Thanks to these acquisitions, the Group became the first Italian staffing agency with a turnover of 360 million Euros and 180 branches in Italy.
In 2007 the internationalization process started with acquisitions in Germany and Poland. 
In 2008 Générale Industrielle and Worknet became one brand: Gi Group. International expansion continued with operations in China, France, Brazil, Spain and India.
In 2009 the international expansion of Gi Group further increased: UK, Argentina and also Romania, where the company acquired Barnett McCall Recruitment.

Another important acquisition occurred in 2015: the business process outsourcing firm Holomatica, based in Brazil, became part of Gi Group. In 2016 the acquisition of TACK & TMI, global learning and development companies now known as Tack TMI, was announced.

Corporate social responsibility 
Gi Group has recently focused on corporate social responsibility. In 2014, the first CSR Report was published. In 2016, Gi Group organized its first global CSR initiative, "Destination Work", aimed at increasing employability through free workshops held by Gi Group's volunteering employees.

References 

Consulting firms established in 1998
Companies of Italy
Human resource management consulting firms
Temporary employment agencies
Multinational companies headquartered in Italy
Actuarial firms

